Canada File is a Canadian documentary television series which aired on CBC Television in 1961.

Premise
This series provided a national rebroadcast of locally produced documentaries and current affairs programming. Contributing local series included Live and Learn (Ottawa), Consensus (Vancouver) and Eye to Eye (Winnipeg). Topics included a discussion by two Carleton University professors on criticism, developmentally-challenged children, writers from French Canada, substance abuse in Vancouver, the situation of black people in Winnipeg, the closure of a Manitoba newspaper and Montreal's St. James Street.

Scheduling
This half-hour series was broadcast Sundays at 1:00 p.m. from 16 July to 24 September 1961.

References

External links
 

CBC Television original programming
1961 Canadian television series debuts
1961 Canadian television series endings